Neocollyris sarawakensis is a species of ground beetle in the genus Neocollyris in the subfamily Carabinae. It was described by Thomson in 1857.

References

Sarawakensis, Neocollyris
Beetles described in 1857